Gurhan Orhan (born March 21, 1954 in Ankara, Turkey), is a  jewelry designer and master goldsmith known for his work with pure gold, pure platinum, and pure silver.

Biography
Gurhan began his career as a jewelry designer at age 40, having “discovered” pure gold and, falling for its allure, deciding to master the craft of working in the pure metal.  Prior to becoming a jewelry designer, Gurhan pursued a number of careers: watchmaker, audio electronics engineer, and a proprietor of night clubs, rock bars and restaurants. Turkish by birth, Gurhan has lived in Greece, Switzerland, France and currently New York City. Gurhan photographed his brand’s national advertising campaigns.

Brand
The brand, GURHAN, was the creation of Gurhan Orhan and his wife, Fiona Tilley.  The brand references only the designer’s first name.  Gurhan began his career as a jewelry designer in the early 1990s and their business was incorporated and launched in the US in 1997.

Collaborations
Gurhan was commissioned by the Metropolitan Museum of Art and exclusively authorized by the government of Afghanistan to create a collection of 24 karat gold jewelry in commemoration of the exhibition Afghanistan: Hidden Treasures of the National Museum, Kabul.

Awards
All
2000 – Grand Prize in Design Trends, awarded by the World Gold Council for Spring bracelet
2000 – First place in Ornamentation, awarded by the World Gold Council for Spring necklace
2004 - First place, awarded by Perles de Tahiti for Tahitian pearl Comet ring
2004 – Third place, awarded by Perles de Tahiti for Tahitian pearl cufflink and stud set
2006 – Blue Ribbon, awarded by the World Gold Council for Pebble suite
2007 – Blue Ribbon, awarded by the World Gold Council for Willow suite
2008 – Blue Ribbon, awarded by the World Gold Council for Lush suite and Dome ring
2009 – Everyday Luxury, awarded by the Platinum Guild International for one-of-a-kind platinum ring with a Mexican Opal
2009 – Best Designer in Gold, awarded by JQ International and selected by retailers throughout the United States

References

External links
http://www.gurhan.com

1954 births
Living people
People from Ankara
Turkish goldsmiths
Turkish jewellers
Turkish silversmiths